Thomas P. Kelly III is an American diplomat who served as the U.S. Ambassador to Djibouti and Acting Assistant Secretary of State for Political-Military Affairs.

Early life and education 
Kelly was born in 1961, and is a native of Manhattan Beach, California. Kelly earned his bachelor's degree from the School of Foreign Service at Georgetown University in 1984. He then earned a master's degree in development economics from Stanford University and another in Latin American studies from Georgetown University.

Career 
Kelly began his career in the United States Foreign Service in 1985, and has served in U.S. Missions in San Salvador, Santiago, Chile, Quito, Vilnius, Buenos Aires, and São Paulo. Kelly worked in the Bureau of Economic and Business Affairs from 1988 to 1990 and in the Office of the United States Trade Representative.

Kelly was nominated to serve as U.S. Ambassador to Djibouti by President Barack Obama on April 7, 2014. He presented his credentials on October 13, 2014. Kelly's mission was terminated on January 15, 2017, and he was replaced by Larry André Jr.

After the end of the Obama Administration, Kelly became the Vice President for Policy and Advocacy at Raytheon.

References 

1961 births
Living people
Ambassadors of the United States to Djibouti
People from Manhattan Beach, California
Raytheon Company people
Walsh School of Foreign Service alumni
Stanford University alumni
United States Foreign Service personnel
21st-century American diplomats